Çağla Akalın (born 17 June 1990) is a Turkish actress, model, columnist, singer, and human rights activist.

In 2013, she became the first trans beauty pageant title holder at the Miss Queen competition for transgenders in Turkey. She is also Turkey's first transgender model. In 2013, she revealed in an interview with Hürriyet that she had chosen her first name and surname after model Çağla Şıkel and singer Demet Akalın, respectively.

In 2015, with her role in the movie Köpek, Akalın became Turkey's first transgender actress to get a leading role.

References

External links 
 
 

1990 births
Living people
Turkish film actresses
Turkish LGBT rights activists
Turkish LGBT actors
Turkish LGBT singers
Turkish LGBT writers
Turkish transgender people
Transgender actresses
Transgender singers